The pied crow (Corvus albus) is a widely distributed African bird species in the crow genus.

Structurally, the pied crow is better thought of as a small crow-sized raven, especially as it can hybridise with the Somali crow (dwarf raven) where their ranges meet in the Horn of Africa. Its behaviour, though, is more typical of the Eurasian carrion crows, and it may be a modern link (along with the Somali crow) between the Eurasian crows and the common raven.

Description
It is approximately the size of the European carrion crow or a little larger (46–50 cm in length) but has a proportionately larger bill, slightly longer tail and wings, and longer legs. As its name suggests, its glossy black head and neck are interrupted by a large area of white feathering from the shoulders down to the lower breast. The tail, bill and wings are black too. The eyes are dark brown. The white plumage of immature birds is often mixed with black. It resembles the white-necked and thick-billed ravens but has a much smaller bill.

Measurements 
 Length 46 – 52 cm
 Wing 328 to 388 mm (17 unsexed birds)
 Weight 520g

Identification 
In southern Africa the range overlaps with the white-necked raven.
The pied crow is slightly smaller and has a white chest and belly with a black, more delicate beak compared to the black chest and belly of the larger white-necked raven which also has a white tipped and weightier beak.
It is larger than the black crow.

Voice 
The voice is often described as a harsh "ar-ar-ar-ar" or "karh-karh-karh".

Taxonomy
The pied crow was first described in 1776 by Statius Muller. Its specific name is the Latin adjective albus, meaning "white".

The Maasai people call it Ol-korrok from the sound of its call. It is considered annoying but not a bird of ill-omen.

Distribution and habitat
This species, Africa's most widespread member of the genus Corvus, occurs from Sub-Saharan Africa, specifically Nigeria, Ghana, Senegal, Sudan, Somalia Eritrea, Zambia and Zimbabwe down to the Cape of Good Hope and on the large island of Madagascar, the Comoros islands, Aldabra, Assumption Island, Cosmoledo, Astove Island, Zanzibar, Pemba and Fernando Po. It inhabits mainly open country with villages and towns nearby. It does not occur in the equatorial rainforest region. It is rarely seen very far from human habitation, though it is not as tied to the urban way of life as the house crow (Corvus splendens) of Asia, and may be encountered far from human habitation in Eritrea.

Behaviour

Pied crows are generally encountered in pairs or small groups, although an abundant source of food may bring large numbers of birds. The species behaves in a similar manner to the hooded and carrion crows. In Dakar, birds have been observed mobbing passing ospreys and snake eagles but avoiding black kites.

Diet
All of its food is obtained from the ground, trees, etc. including injured wildlife such as insects and other small invertebrates, small reptiles, small mammals, young birds and eggs, grain, peanuts, carrion and any scraps of human food and fruit. It has been recorded killing and eating roosting Fruit Bats and is frequently seen (sometimes in huge numbers) scavenging around slaughterhouses.

Digestion in the Small Intestine
The small intestine within the African Pied Crows are inclusive of Duodenums, Jejunums, and Ileums, which are vital components of the organ dedicated to nutrient absorption such as fats, proteins, and carbohydrates consumed by the crow.

Pancreatic ducts and two bile ducts make up the Duodenum, therefore providing greater support for nutrient digestion (Okpe et al., 2016). The wall of the small intestine is lined with four main tunics: tunica mucosa, tunica submucosa, tunica musclaris, and tunica serosa. The primary purpose of the said tunics serve to protect the inner environment of the small intestine against foreign invaders that could otherwise harm the Pied Crow. 

Pied Crows tend to operate with restricted digestive capacity despite possessing the capability of consuming greater than half their body weight of food per day. (Allen, 1968). In order to maintain their slender weight, these birds rely on this reduced digestive capacity to aid in food regulation to ensure they can fly swiftly (Lavin et al.,2008). 

The Pied Crows obtain a characteristic looping and spiraling of their small intestine which enhances their digestion and absorption of nutrients (Banks, 1993). These pied birds also obtain restricted gut retention time for food; however, to combat this, they also have increased mucosal surface area evident within their digestive tract (Okpe et al., 2016).

Reproduction

The nest is usually built in tall, isolated trees, though sometimes smaller specimens are used, depending on availability. The cross supports of telephone poles are also frequently used, and both sexes build the nest. A clutch of 3–6 eggs is laid from September to November (depending on latitude) and are pale green spotted with various shades of brown. The eggs are normally covered when the incubating female leaves the nest. Incubation is 18–19 days and the young are usually fledged by around 45 days. Both sexes rear the young.

See also
 Cape crow also known as the  black crow
 White-necked raven
 Corvidae

References

Cited text

External links
 Pied Crow - Species text in The Atlas of Southern African Birds.
 Pied Crow videos, photos & sounds on the Internet Bird Collection

Corvus
Birds of Africa
Birds described in 1776
Taxa named by Philipp Ludwig Statius Müller